Anvar Rajabov, born 23 January 1988, is an Uzbekistani football striker. Her currently plays for Navbahor Namangan in the Uzbek League.

Career
In 2006-2007 he played for Bukhoro. After that he joined Bunyodkor. Rajabov played for Bunyodkor in the 2008 AFC Champions League group stage.

International
He made official debut for national team on 1 June 2011 in friendly against Ukraine. He also played for Uzbekistan U-20 in 2009.

Honours

Club
Bunyodkor
 Uzbek League (4): 2008, 2009, 2010, 2011
 Uzbek Cup (2): 2008, 2010
 AFC Champions League semi-final (1): 2008

References

External links

1988 births
Living people
Uzbekistani footballers
Uzbekistan international footballers
FC Bunyodkor players
Uzbekistani expatriate footballers
Expatriate footballers in Thailand
Uzbekistani expatriate sportspeople in Thailand
Anvar Rajabov
Buxoro FK players
Association football forwards
Uzbekistan Super League players